Musekiwa Chingodza is a Zimbabwean mbira and marimba player and teacher. He was born in 1970 in Zimbabwe.

Biography 

Musekiwa Chingodza was born in Mwangara village, Murewa, Zimbabwe, in 1970. He began playing mbira at the age of five and is self-taught. Through listening to other gwenyambira, or great mbira players, he developed a strong attachment to and love for mbira music. He says, "Our music is both medicine and food, as mbira has the power to heal and to provide for people. Mbira pleases both the living and the dead". In 1991, Musekiwa was a key member of the band Panjea, founded by Chris Berry. He composed the hit song "Ganda" on Panjea's Zimbabwean album. Currently Musekiwa teaches mbira at Prince Edward School in Harare. He is a singer, dancer, drummer, and he plays both mbira dzavadzimu and nyunga nyunga. Following up on "Tsunga", his widely acclaimed CD with Jennifer Kyker, Musekiwa released his CD "VaChingodza Budai Pachena". His newest CD, "Kutema Musasa", was released in 2005.

Discography 
As Musekiwa Chingodza
 VaChingodza Budai Pachena (2004)
 Kutema Musasa (2005)
 Live in Santa Cruz (2012)

With Hungwe
 Tsunga (2001)
 Muronda Tsimba (2009)

With Mhofela
 Tomutenda Mambo (2010)

With Steve Spitalny
 Kudya Zvekukwata: Eating at Other People's Houses (2011)

With Tute Chigamba, Irene Chigamba, and Ngonidzashe Chingodza
 Muzazananda (2017)

With Sumi Madzitateguru
 Tauya Kune Vamwe (2017)

References 

Zimbabwean musicians
Marimbists
Living people
Year of birth missing (living people)